The 2019–20 Niagara Purple Eagles men's basketball team represented Niagara University in the 2019–20 NCAA Division I men's basketball season. The Purple Eagles, led by 1st-year head coach Greg Paulus, played their home games at the Gallagher Center in Lewiston, New York as members of the Metro Atlantic Athletic Conference. They finished the season 12–20 overall, 9–11 in MAAC play to finish in a tie for sixth place. As the #6 seed in the MAAC tournament, they defeated #11 seed Marist 56–54 in the first round. Before they could face #3 seeded Rider in the MAAC tournament quarterfinals, all postseason tournaments were cancelled amid the COVID-19 pandemic.

Previous season
The Purple Eagles finished the 2018–19 season 13–19 overall, 6–12 in MAAC play to finish in a three-way tie for ninth place. As the 11th seed in the 2019 MAAC tournament, they were defeated by No. 6 seed Monmouth in the first round, 76–72.

On March 11, 2019, head coach Chris Casey was fired. He finished at Niagara with a six-year record of 64–129. On March 28, 2019, Niagara hired Patrick Beilein as their new head coach. On October 24, it was announced that head coach Patrick Beilein would be stepping down from his job, citing personal reasons. That same day, assistant coach Greg Paulus was announced as interim head coach.

Roster

Schedule and results

|-
!colspan=12 style=| Exhibition

|-
!colspan=12 style=| Non-conference regular season

|-
!colspan=12 style=| MAAC regular season

|-
!colspan=12 style=| MAAC tournament
|-

|-

Source

References

Niagara Purple Eagles men's basketball seasons
Niagara Purple Eagles
Niagara Purple Eagles men's basketball
Niagara Purple Eagles men's basketball